Goresbridge is a small village located in the east of County Kilkenny, in the province of Leinster, Ireland. Goresbridge is named after a 1756 bridge, built by Colonel Ralph Gore, which provides a crossing of the River Barrow between County Kilkenny and County Carlow in the  South-East region.

Part of the civil parish is Grangesilvia which is in the barony of Gowran.  King Charles II granted Arthur Gore the townland of Barrowmount. The "Battle of Goresbridge" occurred there in June 1798.

The 2011 census the population of the census town was 361.  The local authority is Kilkenny County Council. Goresbridge gives its name to a district electoral division.

History

Goresbridge was located in historic Gaelic kingdom of Ossory (Osraige). Following the Williamite–Jacobite War King Charles II gave grants of land which had been forfeited by the Roman Catholic owners.

Arthur Gore obtained a grant of land, the townland of Barrowmount in parish of Grangesilvia, from Charles II, and by the end of the 17th century the Gore family were well established.

"Goresbridge" was named for the family and the New Bridge built in 1756 by Colonel Ralph Gore. On the 1846 OSI map of Ireland the village is referred to it as Newbridge.

Gore's Bridge

Gore's Bridge has nine-arch's  granite bridge  crossing of the River Barrow between County Kilkenny and County Carlow.   Built in 1756 by Colonel Ralph Gore the Earl of Ross.

This mid eighteenth-century elegantly-composed landmark was built using unrefined Carlow granite. It represents an important element of civil engineering and transport heritage and formed a vital link between the two counties.

Battle of Goresbridge

The Battle of Goresbridge occurred during the Irish Rebellion on 23 June 1798 at Gore's Bridge. During the Wexford Rebellion, and just days Battle of Vinegar Hill, Wexford insurgents attempted to use the Gore's Bridge.

The locally stationed Wexford Militia were defeated, they lost their cavalry, twenty eight soldiers were captured, and the rest fled to Kilkenny. There is a carved granite memorial adjacent to the bridge.

Transport
Goresbridge railway station opened on 26 October 1870, closed for passenger traffic on 26 January 1931 and for goods traffic on 27 January 1947, finally closing altogether on 1 April 1963.
Kilbride Coaches services Goresbridge from Graiguenamanagh or Kilkenny twice a day, except Sundays

See also
List of towns and villages in Ireland
Mount Loftus, the nearby manor house
Jeanville townland

References

Footnotes

Sources 

 
 
 
 
 .
 

Towns and villages in County Kilkenny
Census towns in County Kilkenny